The 11th Kazakhstan President Cup was played from August 24 to August 28, 2018 in Talgar. Six youth teams participated in the tournament (players were born no earlier than 2002.)

Participants

Venues 
All matches took place at Football Centre in Talgar.

Format 
The tournament is held in two stages. At the first stage, six teams are divided into two qualification groups (A and B). Competitions of the first stage were held on a circular system. The winners of the groups advance to the final, while the group runners-up meet to determine third place.

Squads

Group stage
All times UTC+6

Group A

Group B

Match for 5th place

Bronze medal match

Final

Statistics

Goalscorers 

3 goals
  Islambek Gubzhokov
  Oleg Oznobikhin

2 goals
  Musa Gurbanly
  Adilkhan Dobai(1 pen.)
  Ivan Sviridov
  Islom Zoirov

1 goal
  Rauf Magerramov
  Veysal Rzayev(1 pen.)
  Aleksandr Bovkun
  Aset Konchiyev
  Tenizbai Abdurakhmanov
  Mirlan Khudayberdyyev
  Ahmadhon Emomali
  Chonibek Sharipov
  Sunat Ismailov

Awards 

The best player of a tournament
 Islambek Gubzhokov
Goalscorer of a tournament
 Oleg Oznobikhin (3 goals)
The best goalkeeper of a tournament
 Mukhriddin Khasanov
The best defender of a tournament
 Yegor Tkachenko 
The best midfielder of a tournament
 Veysal Rzayev
The best forward of a tournament
 Musa Gurbanly

Prize money 
According to FFK, the prize fund of a tournament will make $15,000. "The teams which took 1, 2 and 3 place will be received, respectively 7,000, 5,000 and 3,000 $.

References 

2018 Kazakhstan President Cup
Kazakhstan President Cup
Kazakhstan President Cup